Mabura Ward is ward number 6 of the 33 wards in Zibagwe Rural District Council of Kwekwe District. It is in Zhombe Communinal Land in Midlands Province of Zimbabwe. It is 100 km north-west-north of Kwekwe and 73 km south-west of Kadoma. Its center is at Bee Mine Township but the sitting councillor operates from Samambwa Township.

Municipality
The Zibagwe Rural District Council runs the ward and at present the ward is represented by a male councillor, on a ZANU-PF ticket.

Shopping centers

 Bee Mine Township
 Columbina Township, 6.4 km south
 Samambwa Township, 13 km north-east

Schools

Primary

Bee Mine Primary School

Bee Mine Primary School was established in 1969.

Samambwa Primary School

Samambwa Primary School is a co-educational school 19 km northeast of Empress Columbina Township. It was established in 1964.

Samambwa Primary School offers primary educational services from Grade 1 to 7 over seven years. The age group for pupils is 6 to 13 years. Compulsory subjects are English, mathematics, and Shona. The school also offers various non-examinable practical subjects which include arts and craft, home economics, music, sports and physical education. These practicals are offered according to the school resources.

Graduates from this school proceed to Samambwa Secondary School a hundred metres south for a four-year GCE O-Level course.

Somapani Primary School

Somapani Primary School was established in 1966.

Secondary

 Bee Mine Secondary School, established in 1981
 Samambwa Secondary School, established in 1984

Health center

Samambwa Clinic is the only health center in Mabura Ward. It is staffed by one qualified nurse and two nurse aides, and it has eight general beds. It is owned by Zivagwe Rural District Council.

Other important places

 Commoner houses
 Ngondoma Irrigation Scheme
 Mabura Caves

Notable residents

 Learnmore Jongwe was born in Samambwa Village, and this is where he was buried.

References

Wards of Zimbabwe